Astrothelium eumultiseptatum is a species of corticolous (bark-dwelling), crustose lichen in the family Trypetheliaceae. Found in Brazil, it was formally described as a new species in 2016 by lichenologists André Aptroot and Marcela Cáceres. The type specimen was collected by the authors in the Fazenda São Francisco (north of Porto Velho, Rondônia), in a low-altitude primary rainforest. The ostioles of the ascomata contains lichexanthone, a lichen product that causes these structures to glow yellow when lit with a long-wavelength UV light. The main characteristic that distinguishes it from other members of Astrothelium are its ascospores, which measure 65–70 by 15–17 μm, and only have transverse septa.

References

eumultiseptatum
Lichen species
Lichens described in 2016
Taxa named by André Aptroot
Taxa named by Marcela Cáceres
Lichens of North Brazil